Coronel Bolognesi is a Peruvian football club located in the city of Tacna. It was founded on 18 October 1929 and is named after Francisco Bolognesi.

The club is the biggest of Tacna city.

The club was founded in 1929 and play in the Peruvian Segunda División which is the second division of the Peruvian league.

Rivalries
Coronel Bolognesi has had a long-standing rivalry with Mariscal Miller.

Stadium
Coronel Bolognesi play their home games at the Estadio Jorge Basadre, located in the city of Tacna.

Historic Badges

Notable players

Peruvian players
 Germán Carty
 Juan Cominges
 Paul Cominges
 Johan Fano
 Miguel Mostto
 Diego Penny
 Luis Ramírez
 Junior Ross
 Johan Vásquez
 David Soria Yoshinari

Foreign players
 Federico Martorell
   José Andrés Bilibio
 Masakatsu Sawa
 Miguel Ostersen

Honours

National
Torneo Clausura:
Winners (1): 2007

Torneo Interzonal:
Winners (1): 1977
Runner-up (1): 1978

Copa Perú: 
Winners (2): 1976, 2001
Runner-up (2): 1998, 2000

Regional
Región VIII: 
Winners (4): 1998, 1999, 2000, 2001  

Liga Departamental de Tacna: 
Winners (15): 1966, 1967, 1970, 1971, 1972, 1973, 1974, 1996, 1997, 1998, 1999, 2000, 2001, 2013, 2015

Performance in CONMEBOL competitions
Copa Libertadores: 1 appearance
2008: First Round

Copa Sudamericana: 3 appearances
2004: Preliminary Round
2006: First Round
2007: First Round

References

Football clubs in Peru
Association football clubs established in 1929
Coronel Bolognesi